Cibi Lake is a lake in Eryuan County, northwestern Yunnan Province, China. It lies about 73 km north of Dali City. It is fed by the Fengyu River and drains southward into the Erhai Lake via the Miju River (the upstream of it called Haiwei River).The lake is 6.1 km long and 0.75–2.5 km wide, with a 17 km shoreline.

Notes

Lakes of Yunnan
Geography of Dali Bai Autonomous Prefecture